Hell Bound is a 1957 American crime film directed by William J. Hole Jr. and written by Richard H. Landau. The film stars John Russell, June Blair, Stuart Whitman, Margo Woode and George E. Mather. The film was released in October 1957, by United Artists.

Plot
A Los Angeles criminal plots the robbery of a ship carrying $2 million worth of surplus narcotics left over from World War II. His plan goes awry when his backer's girlfriend, drafted into a key role in the plan to keep an eye on the bigwig's up-front investment, falls for an ambulance attendant who is an unsuspecting pawn in the scheme. 

The climax was filmed at Terminal Island, where hundreds of obsolete "Red Car" inter-urban electric trolleys were stacked awaiting scrapping.

Cast

References

External links
 

1957 films
Film noir
United Artists films
American crime films
1957 crime films
1950s English-language films
1950s American films